Half-time is an interval between two periods of a sporting match.

Half time may also refer to:

Half time (electronics), the time it takes for a pulse to drop to 50% of its peak amplitude
Jennifer Lopez: Halftime (2022), a documentary film about Jennifer Lopez
Half Time (horse) (foaled 1896), an American Thoroughbred racehorse
Half time (music), a type of feel that alters the meter of music
Half time (physics), the time for a quantity to halve the difference between its present and final values
"Halftime" (song), a song by Nas

See also
Part-time, a form of employment with fewer hours than a full-time job